The Seringapatam-class frigates, were a class of British Royal Navy 46-gun sailing frigates.

Design 
Seringapatams design was based on the French frigate , which the British had captured in 1806. Seringapatam was originally ordered as a 38-gun frigate, but the re-classification of British warships which took effect in February 1817 raised this rating to 46-gun.

Class and subclasses 
The Admiralty ordered six further ships to this design – including three ships which had originally been ordered as s, but the Seringapatam design was subsequently altered to produce a Modified version which was labelled the Druid sub-class, and three of the ships formerly ordered to the Seringapatam original design (Madagascar, Nemesis and Jason) were re-ordered to this modified design. Subsequently, a further modification of the design was produced, which was labelled the Andromeda sub-class, and the remaining three of the ships formerly ordered to the Seringapatam original design (Manilla, Tigris and Statira) were re-ordered to this modified design. Further vessels were ordered to both modified designs, but the majority of these were subsequently cancelled. Both modified types are listed below.

Ships in the class 

 Builder: British East India Company, Bombay Dockyard.
 Ordered: 21 August 1813
 Laid down: November 1817
 Launched: 5 September 1819
 Completed: 10 April 1821 at Plymouth Dockyard.
 Fate: Receiving ship at Cape of Good Hope in July 1847; coal hulk 1852, broken up between 1873 and 1883.

Druid sub-class (1st modified version of Seringapatam Class)

 Builder: Pembroke Dockyard.
 Ordered: 23 July 1817
 Laid down: August 1821
 Launched: 1 July 1825
 Completed: 21 December 1825 at Plymouth Dockyard.
 Fate: Sold to be broken up in April 1863.
- had first been ordered to Modified Leda class, later to original Seringapatam design
 Builder: Pembroke Dockyard.
 Ordered: 23 July 1817
 Laid down: August 1823
 Launched: 19 August 1826
 Completed: never completed; laid up at Plymouth Dockyard.
 Fate: Broken up in July 1866.
 – had first been ordered to original Seringapatam design
 Builder: East India Company, Bombay Dockyard.
 Ordered: 5 April 1819
 Laid down: October 1821
 Launched: 15 November 1822; 1164 tons (bm)
 Completed: January 1829 at Portsmouth Dockyard.
 Fate: Sold to be broken up at Rio de Janeiro 5 May 1863.

 Builder: Pembroke Dockyard.
 Ordered: 15 May 1821
 Laid down: October 1824
 Launched: 15 April 1828
 Completed: never completed; laid up at Plymouth Dockyard.
 Fate: Sold to be broken up on 15 May 1906.
 
 Builder: Pembroke Dockyard.
 Ordered: 15 May 1821
 Laid down: July 1825
 Launched: 9 October 1828
 Completed: never completed; laid up at Plymouth Dockyard.
 Fate: Renamed Monmouth 1868. Sold to be broken up in 1902.

 Builder: Chatham Dockyard.
 Ordered: 8 January 1822
 Laid down: September 1825
 Launched: 20 December 1827
 Completed: 3 March 1828.
 Fate: Sold to Trinity House in May 1867.

 Builder: Chatham Dockyard.
 Ordered: 13 September 1824
 Laid down: February 1827
 Launched: 19 February 1829
 Completed: 20 March 1828.
 Fate: Sold to be broken up in November 1865.
A further vessel, HMS Jason, also first ordered to Modified Leda Class, then to the original Seringapatam design, was again re-ordered subsequently, now to the Andromeda design, but was never finally built.

Andromeda sub-Class (2nd modified version of Seringapatam Class)

 Builder: East India Company, Bombay Dockyard.
 Ordered: 5 April 1827
 Laid down: August 1827
 Launched: 6 January? 1829; 1166 tons (bm)
 Completed: not completed – laid up at Plymouth Dockyard.
 Fate: Provision hulk November 1846. Sold to be broken up on 24 December 1863.
HMS Seahorse
 Builder: Pembroke Dockyard.
 Ordered: 9 January 1823
 Laid down: November 1826
 Launched: 22 July 1830
 Completed: never completed as sailing frigate; laid up at Plymouth Dockyard.
 Fate: Converted to a steam/screw-driven frigate 1845–47. Screw mortar frigate 1856. Coal hulk 1870, renamed Lavinia. Sold to be broken up 1902.
HMS Stag
 Builder: Pembroke Dockyard.
 Ordered: 9 January 1823
 Laid down: April 1828
 Launched: 2 October 1830
 Completed: 9 July 1831 at Portsmouth Dockyard.
 Fate: Broken up in August 1866.
HMS Maeander
 Builder: Chatham Dockyard.
 Ordered: 13 September 1824
 Laid down: February 1829
 Launched: 5 May 1840
 Completed: 17 January 1848.
 Fate: Hulked 1857. Wrecked at Ascension in July 1870.
HMS Forth
 Builder: Pembroke Dockyard.
 Ordered: 9 June 1825
 Laid down: November 1828
 Launched: 1 August 1833
 Completed: never completed as a sailing frigate; laid up at Plymouth Dockyard.
 Fate: Converted to a steam/screw-driven frigate 1845–47. Screw mortar frigate 1856. Coal hulk 1869, renamed Jupiter. Sold to be broken up 1883.

The remaining ships ordered or re-ordered to this design were never completed:
HMS Jason – ordered 23 July 1817 from Woolwich Dockyard, firstly to Modified Leda Class design, later altered to original Seringapatam design in October 1820, to Druid design in 1822, and finally to Andromeda design in 1826; cancelled 7 February 1831.
HMS Statira – ordered 23 July 1817 from Plymouth Dockyard, originally to Modified Leda Class, later altered to original Seringapatam design in October 1820, to Druid design in 1822, and finally to Andromeda design in 1826; cancelled 31 August 1832.
HMS Manilla – ordered 5 April 1819 from East India Company's Bombay Dockyard, firstly ordered to original Seringapatam design, later altered to Andromeda design in 1826; cancelled 7 February 1831. 
HMS Euphrates – ordered 22 October 1820 from Portsmouth Dockyard, cancelled 7 February 1831.
HMS Pique – ordered 25 October 1820 from Plymouth Dockyard, cancelled 16 June 1832.
HMS Tigris – ordered 25 October 1820 from Plymouth Dockyard (utilising teak frames from Bombay Dockyard), firstly to original Seringapatam design, later altered to Andromeda design in 1826; cancelled 31 August 1832.
HMS Pique – ordered 25 October 1820 from Plymouth Dockyard, cancelled 16 June 1832.
HMS Spartan – ordered 13 September 1824 from Portsmouth Dockyard, cancelled 7 February 1831.
HMS Theban – ordered 13 September 1824 from Portsmouth Dockyard, cancelled 7 February 1831.
HMS Inconstant – ordered 9 June 1825 from Sheerness Dockyard, cancelled 9 March 1832.
HMS Orpheus – ordered 9 June 1825 from Chatham Dockyard, cancelled 7 February 1831.
HMS Severn – ordered 9 June 1825 from Plymouth Dockyard, cancelled 7 February 1831.
HMS Tiber – ordered 9 June 1825 from Portsmouth Dockyard, cancelled 7 February 1831.

References

Bibliography

David Lyon and Rif Winfield (2004), The Sail and Steam Navy List 1815–1889. Chatham Publishing, London. .
Phipps, John, (of the Master Attendant's Office, Calcutta), (1840) A Collection of Papers Relative to Ship Building in India ...: Also a Register Comprehending All the Ships ... Built in India to the Present Time .... (Scott).

 
Frigate classes
Ship classes of the Royal Navy